Tubaani also referred to as steamed black-eyed peas' pudding  is a popular Ghanaian dish that is commonly eaten in the northern regions and Zongo communities of Ghana. The dish consists of a paste made from the flour of black-eyed peas and water which is then cooked after being first wrapped in the sweet-tasting, aromatic leaves of the Marantaceous herb Thaumatococcus daniellii and served with gravy or pepper and sliced onions tossed in hot vegetable oil.

Ingredients 

 Black eyed peas or cow pea flour
 Water

Method of preparation 

 Mix the black eyed pea flour with water in a bowl and beat the mixture in circular motion until it becomes fluffy
 Put some water in a saucepan and leave it on fire to boil
 Wash Thaumatococcus daniellii leaves or banana leaves or corn husk
 Place some of the leaves in the sauce pan on fire to form a base
 Serve small portions of the fluffy black eyed pea flour mixture in the leaves and wrap
 Put the wrapped mixture in the boiling water on fire and allow it to cook for sometime
 Use some of the leaves to cover the top of the water in the saucepan
 Cover and steam the content of the saucepan for about two hours

Benefits 
It contains proteins, iron, Vitamin B9, proteins and soluble fibre as it is made from beans.

See also 

 Moin moin, a similar Nigerian dish

References

Legume dishes
Ghanaian cuisine